Nemoria is a genus of emerald moths in the family Geometridae. It was named by Jacob Hübner in 1818.

Description
Palpi porrect (extending forward). Forewings with veins 7, 8, 9 and 10 stalked and veins 6 and 11 often being stalked with them. Vein 11 anastomosing (fusing) with vein 12, and then with vein 10. Hindwings with rounded outer margin. Veins 3, 4 and 6, 7 stalked. Frenulum present.

Species
Species include:
 Nemoria aemularia Barnes & McDunnough, 1918
 Nemoria albaria (Grote, 1883)
 Nemoria albilineata Cassino, 1927
 Nemoria arizonaria (Grote, 1883)
 Nemoria bifilata (Walker, [1863]) – white-barred emerald
 Nemoria bistriaria Hübner, 1818 – red-fringed emerald
 Nemoria caerulescens Prout, 1912
 Nemoria catachloa (Hulst, 1898)
 Nemoria daedalea Ferguson, 1969
 Nemoria darwiniata (Dyar, 1904) – Columbian emerald
 Nemoria diamesa Ferguson, 1969
 Nemoria elfa Ferguson, 1969 – cypress emerald
 Nemoria extremaria (Walker, 1861)
 Nemoria festaria (Hulst, 1886)
 Nemoria glaucomarginaria (Barnes & McDunnough, 1917)
 Nemoria intensaria (Pearsall, 1911)
 Nemoria latirosaria (Pearsall, 1906)
 Nemoria leptalea Ferguson, 1969
 Nemoria lixaria (Guenée, [1858]) – red-bordered emerald
 Nemoria mimosaria (Guenée, [1858]) – white-fringed emerald
 Nemoria mutaticolor Prout, 1912
 Nemoria obliqua (Hulst, 1898)
 Nemoria outina Ferguson, 1969
 Nemoria pistaciaria (Packard, 1876)
 Nemoria pulcherrima (Barnes & McDunnough, 1916)
 Nemoria rindgei Ferguson, 1969
 Nemoria rubrifrontaria (Packard, 1873) – red-fronted emerald
 Nemoria saturiba Ferguson, 1969
 Nemoria splendidaria (Grossbeck, 1910)
 Nemoria strigataria (Grossbeck, 1910)
 Nemoria subsequens Ferguson, 1969
 Nemoria tuscarora Ferguson, 1969
 Nemoria unitaria (Packard, 1873) – single-lined emerald
 Nemoria viridicaria (Hulst, 1880)
 Nemoria zelotes Ferguson, 1969
 Nemoria zygotaria (Hulst, 1886)

References

Geometrinae